Sarigama is a 2016 Sinhala musical film written and directed by Somaratne Dissanayake and produced by his wife Renuka Balasooriya for Cine Films Lanka. The film stars Pooja Umashankar and Ashan Dias as leading roles while Malini Fonseka and Gayani Gisantika also play key supporting roles. It was released on 2 December 2016 only on EAP 3D cinemas.

Origin 

The film is an adaptation of the 1965 Oscar award-winning musical Sound of Music, which was based on the autobiography of Maria Von Trapp in 1949. Changes were made to suit the local setting, and the film avoids politics altogether; the film ends with the marriage of Maria and the Captain. The film was shot in picturesque hill country areas capturing the natural attractions of the island.

Plot 

Maria (Pooja Umashankar), a young and beautiful music-loving girl enters a convent with the intention of becoming a Catholic nun. Her playful behavior and strong desire to make music create difficulties with the convent's administration. She is sent away to become a governess to the seven children of a widowed ex-navy captain (Ashan Dias). Maria's playful friendliness towards the children and the very strict captain attracts the love of both the children and the captain, changing all of their lives.

Cast 
Pooja Umashankar as Maria
Ashan Dias as Captain Tony
Gayani Gisantika as Sandra
Somasiri Alakolnga as John
Malani Fonseka as Reverend Mother
Rathna Lalani Jayakody as Sister Rita
Sakunathala Sathsarani as Sister Kathy
Bhudhi Randheniya as Sister Lisa
Sherin Ishani as Sister Sofia
Narthana Dhilmini as Sister Eva
Lalith Janakaantha as Max
Ramya Wanigasekara as Dalcy
Dasun Madusanka as Michael

Children
Sinethi Akila as Olu
Thisuri Anjali as Nelum
Kaushalya Nirmana as Saman
Milni Menaara as Manel
Pramuditha Udayakumara as Sandun
Menaaraa Thisanya as Kumudu
Vethuli Umanya as Rosy

Music 
The film had music scored by Rohana Weerasinghe and director Somaratne Dissanayake wrote the songs. Thirteen songs were released onto CD and sold at cinemas where the film was playing. Singers included Nanda Malini, Edward Jayakody, Uresha Ravihari, Sashika Nisansala and Harshana Dissanayake.

References

External links
 සම්මානයක් ලැබුණාම ඔළුවට තව බරක් - Gayani Gisanthika

2016 films
2010s Sinhala-language films
Remakes of Sri Lankan films